Marcus Hanan (born 10 March 2000) is an Irish rugby union player, currently playing for Pro14 and European Rugby Champions Cup side Leinster. His preferred position is prop.

Leinster
Hanan was named in the Leinster side for Round 12 of the 2020–21 Pro14 against . He made his debut in the same match, coming on as a replacement. Hanan had come through the Leinster Academy system, joining the academy full time in August 2021. He played his junior rugby for Clane, who he had played for since the age of seven.

References

External links
itsrugby.co.uk Profile

2000 births
Living people
Irish rugby union players
Leinster Rugby players
Rugby union props